Georges Duval (2 February 1847 – 23 September 1919) was a French journalist and playwright.

Biographie 
Georges Duval was a columnist at Le Gaulois under the pseudonyms Claude Rieux and Tabartin. He also collaborated with the newspaper L'Événement.

In 1883, Guy de Maupassant dedicated him his short story Le Cas de madame Luneau.

His greatest theatrical success was the comédie en vaudeville Coquin de printemps, composed in 1888 with Adolphe Jaime. This play was revived in Broadway in 1906 by Richard Carle under the title Spring Chicken. In 1898, he also wrote with Albert Vanloo, the libretto of the operetta Véronique by André Messager.

In 1892, he was chief editor of La Libre Parole.

Works 
Comedies
1874: Madame Mascarille, comedy in one act and in verse (Théâtre de Cluny)
1876: Aux quatre coins, one-act comedy (Théâtre des Bouffe-Parisien)
1880: Voltaire chez Houdon, comedy in one act and in verse 
 Le Petit Bleu, one-act comedy
 La Bagasse, three-act comedy
 Le Hanneton d'Héloïse, four-act vaudeville
 La Pie au nid, three-act comédie en vaudeville
 Adieu Cocotte !, three-act comedy
 Le Remplaçant, three-act comedy
 Le Voyage autour du Code, three-act comedy
 Le Coup de Fouet, three-act comedy

Other
1875: Le Tour du monde en 80 minutes, three-act revue
1878: Artistes et cabotins (1878)
1879: Histoire de la littérature révolutionnaire
1880: La Morte galante, novel
1880: Les Petites Abraham
1881: Vauluisant et Bouleau
1881: Un Amour sous la Révolution
1881: Le Miracle de l'abbé Dulac 
1883: Le Premier Amant 
1884: Vieille histoire 
1884: Les Orphelins d'Amsterdam
1884–1889: Le Carnaval parisien 
1885: Laurette 
1886: L'Homme à la plume noire
1886: Un Coup de fusil
1886: Paris qui rit 
1887: Le Tonnelier 
 Mai 1871
1887: Une Virginité 
1888: Coquin de printemps !, three-act vaudeville with Adolphe Jaime
1898: Véronique, operetta (music by André Messager), with Albert Vanloo.
 Les Colères du Fleuve, à-propos in verse

References

External links 
 Georges Duval on 

19th-century French journalists
French male journalists
19th-century French dramatists and playwrights
Writers from Paris
1847 births
1919 deaths
19th-century French male writers